Sebastián Zurita Bach (born 22 November 1986) is a Mexican actor.

Biography
The eldest son of actors Humberto Zurita and Christian Bach, Sebastián Zurita Bach made his acting debut as a child, appearing in Cañaveral de Pasiones (1996) as young Pablo Montero. After several years, the then 21-year-old actor made his television return in En Nombre del Amor (2008) as Emiliano Saenz. A year later, Zurita joined the cast of the 2009 remake of the telenovela Corazón Salvaje inspired by the original 1956 novel by Caridad Bravo Adams. He also starred in the 2010 film Ángel Caído, along with his father and younger brother Emiliano Zurita.

Filmography

Awards and nominations

References

External links
 

1986 births
Mexican male child actors
Mexican male telenovela actors
Mexican male film actors
Male actors from Mexico City
Living people
Mexican people of Argentine descent
Mexican people of German descent
Mexican people of Italian descent
21st-century Mexican male actors